Cooch Behar, or Koch Bihar, is a city and a municipality in the Indian state of West Bengal. It is the headquarters of the Cooch Behar district. Cooch Behar is the only planned city in the North Bengal region with remnants of royal heritage. Being one of the main tourist destinations of West Bengal, housing the Cooch Behar Palace and Madan Mohan Temple, it has been declared a heritage city. It is the maternal home of Maharani Gayatri Devi of Jaipur.

During the British Raj, Cooch Behar was the seat of the princely state of Koch Bihar, ruled by the Koch Kingdom of often described as the Shiva Vansha, tracing their origin from the Koch tribe of North-eastern India. After 20 August 1949, Cooch Behar District was transformed from a princely state to its present status, with the city of Cooch Behar (Koch Behar) as its headquarters.

Etymology

The name Cooch Behar is derived from two words—Cooch, a corrupted form of the word Koch, the name of the Koch tribes, and the word behar is derived from vihara meaning land, Koch Behar means land of the Koches.

History

Early period

Cooch Behar formed part of the Kamarupa Kingdom of Assam from the 4th to the 12th. In the 13th century, the area became a part of the Kamata Kingdom. The Khens ruled until about 1498 CE, when they fell to Alauddin Hussain Shah, the independent Pathan Sultan of Gour. The new invaders fought with the local Bhuyan chieftains and the Ahom king Suhungmung and lost control of the region. During this time, the Koch tribe became very powerful and proclaimed itself Kamateshwar (Lord of Kamata) and established the Koch dynasty.

The first important Koch ruler was Bisu, later called Biswa Singha, who came to power in 1515 CE. Under his son, Nara Narayan, the Kamata Kingdom reached its zenith. Nara Narayan's younger brother, Shukladhwaj (Chilarai), was a noted military general who undertook expeditions to expand the kingdom. He became governor of its eastern portion.

As the early capital of the Koch Kingdom, Koch Behar's location was not static and became stable only when shifted to Cooch Behar town. Rup Narayan, on the advice of an unknown saint, transferred the capital from Attharokotha to Guriahati (now called Cooch Behar town) on the banks of the Torsa river between 1693 and 1714. After this, the capital was always in or near its present location.

In 1661 CE, Pran Narayan planned to expand his kingdom. However, Mir Jumla, the subedar of Bengal under the Mughal emperor Aurangazeb, attacked Cooch Behar and conquered the territory, meeting almost no resistance.
The town of Cooch Behar was subsequently named Alamgirnagar. Pran Narayan regained his kingdom within a few days.

British Raj

In 1772–1773, the king of Bhutan attacked and captured Cooch Behar. To expel the Bhutanese, the kingdom of Cooch Behar signed a defense treaty with the British East India Company on 5 April 1773. At that time, coins of Bhutan were minted in Cooch Behar. After expelling the Bhutanese, Cooch Behar again became a princely kingdom under the protection of the British East India company.

Cooch Behar Palace is built after the Classical Italian architecture. The dome of the Palace is in Italian style, resembling the dome of St. Peter's Basilica, Vatican City, Rome, and built in 1887, during the reign of Maharaja Nripendra Narayan. In 1878, the maharaja married the daughter of Brahmo preacher Keshab Chandra Sen. This union led to a renaissance in Cooch Behar state. Maharaja Nripendra Narayan is known as the architect of modern Cooch Behar town.

Post-Independence
Under an agreement between the king of Cooch Behar and the Indian Government at the end of British rule, Maharaja Jagaddipendra Narayan transferred full authority, jurisdiction, and power of the state to the Dominion Government of India, effective 12 September 1949. Eventually, Cooch Bihar became part of the state of West Bengal on 19 January 1950, with Cooch Behar town as its headquarters.

Geography

The Torsa river flows by the western side of town. Heavy rains often cause strong river currents and flooding. The turbulent water carries huge amounts of sand, silt, and pebbles, which have an adverse effect on crop production as well as on the hydrology of the region. Alluvial deposits form the soil, which is acidic. The soil has low levels of nitrogen with moderate levels of potassium and phosphorus. Deficiencies of boron, zinc, calcium, magnesium, and sulphur are high.

Cooch Behar is a flat region with a slight southeastern slope along which the main rivers of the district flow. Most of the highland areas are in the Sitalkuchi region, and most of the low-lying lands lie in Dinhata region. The elevation of the town is 48 meters above mean sea level. The Torsa river flows by the western side of town. The rivers in the district of Cooch Behar generally flow from northwest to southeast. Six rivers that cut through the district are the Teesta, Jaldhaka, Torsha, Kaljani, Raidak, Gadadhar, and Ghargharia.

The town of Cooch Behar and its surrounding regions face deforestation due to increasing demand for fuel and timber, as well as air pollution from increasing vehicular traffic. The local flora includes palms, bamboos, creepers, ferns, orchids, aquatic plants, fungi, timber, grass, vegetables, and fruit trees. Migratory birds, along with many local species, are found in the city, especially around the Sagardighi and other water bodies.

It shares the park with the Alipurduar district.

Climate

Cooch Behar has a moderate climate characterized by heavy rainfall during the monsoons and slight rainfall from October to March. The city does not experience very high temperatures at any time of the year. The highest temperature in Cooch Behar was 41.0 °C, recorded on 11 September 1977; the lowest temperature recorded was 3.3 °C, reported on 28 January 1982. The atmosphere is highly humid. The rainy season lasts from June to September.

Demographics
In the 2011 census, Cooch Behar Urban Agglomeration had a population of 106,760, out of which 53,803 were males, and 52,957 were females. The 0–6 years population was 7,910. Effective literacy rate for the over 7 population was 91.75%.

As per the 2001 census, the Cooch Behar municipal area has a population of 76,812. The sex ratio is 972 females per 1,000 males. The decadal growth rate for the population is 7.86%. Males constitute 50.6% of the population, and females constitute 49.4%. Cooch Behar has an average literacy rate of 82%, which is higher than the national average of 64.84%. The male literacy rate is 86%, while the female literacy rate is 77%. In Cooch Behar, 9% of the population is under 6 years of age.

The major religions followed in Cooch Behar are Hinduism (76.44%) followed by Islam (23.34%). Commonly spoken languages are Bengali and Kamtapuri.

Government and politics

Civic administration

Cooch Behar Municipality is responsible for the civic administration of the town. The municipality consists of a board of councilors, elected from each of the 20 wards and a few members nominated by the state government. The board of councilors elects a chairman from among its elected members; the chairman is the executive head of the municipality. The All India Trinamool Congress holds power in the municipality. The state government looks after education, health, and tourism.

The town is in the Cooch Behar constituency and elects one member to the Lok Sabha (the Lower House of the Indian Parliament). The town area is covered by one assembly constituency, Cooch Behar Dakshin, that elects one member to the Vidhan Sabha, which is the West Bengal state legislative assembly. Cooch Behar town comes under the jurisdiction of the district police (which is a part of the state police); the Superintendent of Police oversees security and matters pertaining to law and order. Cooch Behar is home to the District Court.

Utility services

Cooch Behar is a well-planned town, and the municipality is responsible for providing basic services, such as potable water and sanitation. The water is supplied by the municipality using its groundwater resources, and almost all the houses in the municipal area are connected. Solid waste is collected every day by the municipality van from individual houses. The surface drains, mostly cemented, drain into the Torsa River. Electricity is supplied by the West Bengal State Electricity Board, and the West Bengal Fire Service provides emergency services like fire tenders. Most of the roads are metalled (macadam), and street lighting is available throughout the town. The Public Works Department is responsible for road maintenance and on the roads connecting Cooch Behar with other towns in the region. Health services in Cooch Behar include a government-owned District Hospital, a Regional Cancer Centre, and private nursing homes. Utility services provided in Cooch Behar are considered one of the best government utility services of West Bengal though the city gets totally flooded during heavy rains nowadays due to the problems of the drainage system.

Health facilities 
The city has one district hospital MJN Hospital which has 400 beds. The hospital has now been converted to Coochbehar Government Medical College and Hospital. The city has numerous Multi-Speciality Hospitals offering. Some major hospitals are Shubham Hospital, Cooch Behar Mission Hospital, Dr. P K Saha Hospital Pvt. Ltd. etc.

Market facilities 
In the municipality are four daily markets, two wholesale markets, and eight commercial complexes. Apart from these, two new malls have also opened recently.

Economy
The central and state governments are the small number of employers in Cooch Behar town. Cooch Behar is home to a number of district-level and divisional-level offices and has a large government-employee workforce. Business is mainly centred on retail goods; the main centres lie on B.S. Road, Rupnarayan Road, Keshab Road and at Bhawaniganj Bazar.

An industrial park has been built at Chakchaka,  from town, on the route to Tufanganj. A number of companies have set up industries there.

Farming is a major source of livelihood for the nearby rural populace, and it supplies the town with fruits and vegetables. Poorer sections of this semi-rural society are involved in transport, basic agriculture, small shops, and manual labor in construction.

Cooch Behar has been witnessing radical changes, along with rapid development in segments like industry, real estate, and information technology firms, and education, since the advent of the twenty-first century. The changes are with respect to infrastructure and industrial growth for steel (direct reduced iron), metal, cement, and knowledge-based industries. Many engineering, technology, management, and professional study colleges have opened at Cooch Behar. Housing co-operatives and flats, shopping malls, hotels, and stadiums have also come up.

As the town is near the international border, the Border Security Force (BSF) maintains a large presence in the vicinity. This gives rise to a large population of semi-permanent residents, who bring revenue to the economy. The state government is trying to promote Cooch Behar as a tourist destination. Though income from tourism is low Cooch Behar is one of the major tourist attractions in West Bengal.

Culture

Every year during the Ras Purnima, the city hosts Ras Mela, one of the largest and oldest fairs of West Bengal. The fair is older than 200 years. The fair is organized by Cooch Behar Municipality in the Ras Mela ground near ABN Seal College. During the fair, it becomes a major economic hub of the whole North Bengal region. Merchants and sellers from all over India and also from Bangladesh join this fair. Earlier, the Maharajas of Cooch Behar used to inaugurate the fair by moving the Ras Chakra, and now the work is executed by the District Magistrate of Cooch Behar District. The Ras Chakra is considered a symbol of communal harmony because it is made by a Muslim Family from generations. A huge crowd gathers in Cooch Behar from neighboring Assam, Jalpaiguri, Alipurduar, and whole North Bengal during the fair.

Novelist Amiya Bhushan Majumdar was born, brought up, and worked in Cooch Behar. Cooch Behar, with its people, culture, and the river Torsha was a recurrent theme in his novels.
Apart from this Cooch Behar has a rich history of Debate, Extempore, Quizzing. A non profit organisation named Cobweb is enthusiastically spreading knowledge and facts. They are also fighting against Fake News, the new social evil of this era.

Tourism 
Cooch Behar is one of the major tourist places of West Bengal. The main attractions are:

Cooch Behar Palace 

It is the main attraction of the city. It was modeled after the Buckingham Palace in London in 1887, during the reign of Maharaja Nripendra Narayan. The Palace is fronted on the ground, and first floors by a series of arcaded verandahs with their piers arranged alternately in single and double rows. At the southern and northern ends, the Palace projects slightly, and in the center is a projected porch providing an entrance to the Durbar Hall. The Hall has an elegantly shaped metal dome which is topped by a cylindrical louver type ventilator. The intros of the dome are carved in stepped patterns, and Corinthian columns support the base of the cupola. This adds variegated colors and designs to the entire surface. There are various halls in the palace and rooms that include the Dressing Room, Bed Room, Drawing Room, Dining Hall, Billiard hall, Library, Toshakhana, Ladies Gallery, and Vestibules. The articles and precious objects that these rooms and halls used to contain are now lost. The original palace was 3 storied, but was subsequently destroyed by a 19th-century earthquake measuring 8.7 on Richter scale. The palace shows the acceptance of the European idealism of the Koch kings and the fact that they had embraced European culture without denouncing their Indian heritage.

Sagar Dighi 

Sagardighi is one of the "Great Ponds" in the heart of Cooch Behar, West Bengal. The name means an ocean-like pond, exaggerated in view of its great significance. As well as being popular with people, it also attracts migratory birds each winter. It is surrounded by many important administrative buildings, like District Magistrates Office, Administrative Building of North Bengal State Transport Corporation, BSNL's DTO Office on the West; Office of the Superintendent of Police, District Library, Municipality Building on the South, Office of BLRO, State Bank of India's Cooch Behar Main Branch and many other on the East and RTO office, Foreigner's registration office, District Court etc. on the North. Most of such buildings are remnants of royal heritage.

Transport

Rickshaws, auto-rickshaws, and Totos are the most widely available public transport in Cooch Behar town. Most of Cooch Behar's residents stay within a few kilometers of the town center and have their own vehicles, mostly motorcycles, and bicycles.

The New Cooch Behar railway station is around 5 km from town and is well connected to almost all major Indian cities, including Kolkata, Delhi, Mumbai, Bangalore, Chennai, Guwahati. All express and Superfast trains going towards North East have a stoppage here. The station came up in 1966 when the Assam link was constructed through North Bengal. Now this station lies on the New Jalpaiguri–New Bongaigaon section of the Barauni-Guwahati line. As of 2018, it is the largest Railway Junction of Northeast Frontier Railway with six routes towards New Changrabandha, New Jalpaiguri, New Bongaigaon, Alipurduar Junction, Dhubri, and Bamanhat. New Cooch Behar railway station is given a beautiful look similar to Cooch Behar Palace. This station is heavily modernised with Wi-Fi facilities, food cafes, children's area, dormitory, waiting lounges and elevators.

Another station named Cooch Behar situated inside the town exists, but only a few pairs of local trains run on this route. This station was built in 1901 when Cooch Behar State Railway constructed Geetaldaha-Jainti line. Now this station is operational due to local train services to Bamanhat. A Railway Museum is constructed in the station area, having a look of Cooch Behar Madan Mohan Temple. This station offers Wi-fi, seating and other basic facilities.

Cooch Behar is very well connected by road with neighboring areas and other cities of West Bengal and the rest of the country. Cooch Behar is a major roadway junction after Siliguri towards Northeast India and Bangladesh. Cooch Behar is headquarters of the North Bengal State Transport Corporation, which runs regular bus service to places in West Bengal, Assam, and Bihar. Private buses are also available. Most buses depart from the Central Bus Terminus near Cooch Behar Rajbari. Hired vehicles are available from the taxi stand near Transport Chowpathi. City buses and autos serve inside and outskirts of the city.

The Cooch Behar Airport offers daily flight services to Kolkata.

IndiGo and Spice Jet are the major carriers that connect the area to Delhi, Kolkata, Guwahati, Mumbai, Chennai, Bangkok, Paro, Bangkok and Chandigarh.

Education 

Cooch Behar's schools usually use English and Bengali as their medium of instruction, although the use of the Hindi language is also stressed. The schools are affiliated with the Indian Certificate of Secondary Education (ICSE) or the Central Board of Secondary Education (CBSE), or the West Bengal Board of Secondary Education. Some of the reputed schools include Jenkins School, Sunity Academy, and Cooch Behar Rambhola High School.

Cooch Behar Panchanan Barma University is the only single university in Cooch Behar. It is a U.G.C. recognized public university in Cooch Behar, West Bengal, India. The university was named after the 19th-century Rajbongshi leader and social reformist, Panchanan Barma. A total of 15 colleges from the Cooch Behar district are affiliated to the university.

There are five colleges and a polytechnic in town, including A.B.N. Seal College, Cooch Behar College, University B.T. & Evening College, Thakur Panchanan Mahila Mahavidyalaya, all of which are affiliated with the Cooch Behar Panchanan Barma University, which was established in 2013.

Acharya Brojendra Nath Seal College was established in 1888 as Victoria College by Maharaja Nripendra Narayan of Koch Bihar to enhance student capability in the Kingdom. The first principal was John Cornwallis Godley, who in 1895 became the second principal of Aitchison College in Lahore. Later, Maharaja Nripendra Naryayan offered the post of principal to Acharya Brojendra Nath Seal, a Brahmo and philosopher, who remained in the post for eighteen years from 1896 to 1913. In 1950, when the state of Cooch Behar was merged into the Union of India, the governance was passed to Government of West Bengal. It was earlier affiliated with the University of Calcutta and University of North Bengal and is now affiliated with Cooch Behar Panchanan Barma University after the creation of the same. In 1970, it was renamed as Acharya Brojendra Nath Seal College. It is one of the few colleges under the Cooch Behar Panchanan Barma University to give postgraduate education. The college is in the heart of the town with a campus of 13.27 acres (53,700 m2) and a built-up area of 9032.96 sq. meters.

In 1981, the Maya Chitram Art Institute was founded in Cooch Behar. There is an agricultural university, Uttar Banga Krishi Vishwavidyalaya, just outside the main town at Pundibari. A medical college is proposed to be opened by the Government at Raja Jagatdipendranarayan TB Hospital.

Cooch Behar Government Engineering College started its first academic session in 2016.

Gallery

See also
 Narendra Narayan Park, a botanical garden in town, founded in 1892
 Cooch Behar Archive
 Cooch Behar Stadium, a multi-purpose stadium

References

External links
 Cooch Behar District's official website

Cities and towns in Cooch Behar district
Former capital cities in India
Cooch Behar
Cities in West Bengal